Aliyu Mohammed Gusau (born 18 May 1943) is a Nigerian general and statesman. He has held several high level national security, military and intelligence offices, and has participated in several military coups, playing a central role in founding the Fourth Nigerian Republic.

He was most recently the Minister of Defence, and has served as National Security Adviser to three presidents; he was also the Chief of Army Staff during Ernest Shonekan and briefly Sani Abacha's regime, headed different intelligence agencies, and was commander of the Nigerian Defence Academy.

Early life

Aliyu Mohammed was born on 18 May 1943 in Gusau, Zamfara State. The army added his birthplace to his name, making "Aliyu Mohammed Gusau", to distinguish him from another General, Aliyu Mohammed. Although Aliyu does not himself use "Gusau" in his name, it has been widely adopted by the media.

Military career 
In 1964, he enrolled as an officer cadet at the Nigerian Defence Academy and was commissioned three years into the Nigerian Army as a second lieutenant. In 1967, he fought during the Nigerian Civil War.

He was Commander of 9 Infantry Brigade, Abeokuta (April 1976 – July 1978), Adjutant General of 2 Mechanised Division (July 1978 – September 1979) and Director of Personnel Services, Army Headquarters (October 1979 – November 1979).

Second Republic 
From November 1979 to December 1983, Aliyu was Director of Military Intelligence (DMI). He played an important role in the coup that ousted President Shehu Shagari and the Second Nigerian Republic on 31 December 1983 and brought General Muhammadu Buhari to power.

Military juntas of 1983–1993 

Following the coup he was proposed as overall head of Intelligence, with the support of Chief of Army Staff Ibrahim Babangida, but the appointment was opposed by Buhari. Buhari confirmed Shagari's appointee Muhammadu Lawal Rafindadi as director of the National Security Organization (NSO), and dismissed Aliyu from the DMI, replacing him with Colonel Halilu Akilu. Aliyu was sent on a training course at the Royal College of Defence Studies in the United Kingdom.

Aliyu was a player in the coup of 27 August 1985, when Babangida replaced Buhari. In the lead-up, due to the influence he had acquired as DMI, Aliyu was placed under intense surveillance and in turn placed pressure on the coup leaders to act swiftly.

After the coup, Aliyu was appointed Director of the Defence Intelligence Agency (DIA) and Acting Director-General of the National Security Organisation (NSO) from September 1985 to August 1986, then Coordinator on National Security from August 1986 to December 1989. He reorganised the security and intelligence apparatuses, which had fallen in disarray under Rafindadi during the Buhari regime, breaking up the NSO into three organisations: State Security Services (SSS), National Intelligence Agency (NIA) and the Defence Intelligence Agency (DIA).

Aliyu was appointed General Officer Commanding 2 Mechanised Division in Ibadan  from December 1989 to August 1990; and Chief of Administration, Defence Headquarters, in Lagos from August 1990 to February 1992. He was Commandant of the Nigerian Defence Academy, Kaduna from February 1992 to January 1993.

Aliyu became National Security Advisor in January 1993, and was promoted to Chief of Army Staff when Babangida passed control to the short-lived civilian government of the Nigerian Third Republic in August 1993.

In November 1993, in a bid to consolidate his power General Sani Abacha removed Aliyu as Chief of Army Staff replacing him with General Chris Alli.

Staying power
Retiring from the army, Aliyu became chairman & chief executive of Alpha Public Affairs Consultancy from December 1993 to May 1999. With wide influence in both civilian and military circles, Aliyu played a central role in ensuring that the transition to democracy in May 1999 went smoothly.

Aliyu was the National Security Advisor in the crucial period when former political office holders in the armed forces were retired in June 1999, helping Obasanjo assume control of the armed forces as a civilian President. He remained National Security Advisor during most of Obasanjo's presidency. He left office to compete in the 2006 People's Democratic Party (PDP) primaries for presidential candidate, coming third. The winner, Umaru Yar'Adua, went on to be elected president.

On 8 March 2010, Acting President Goodluck Jonathan announced that he was removing Major-General Sarki Mukhtar as National Security Adviser and replacing him with Aliyu. A few days later, Aliyu met with the service chiefs in Abuja to discuss the Jos crisis and the security situation in the country. There were rumours that a review of senior army and police assignments could be underway. 

Speaking at a seminar in April 2010, Aliyu said the legal system seemed to promote crime and the law enforcement agencies appeared overwhelmed. He also said that efforts to fight corruption were perceived as selective and ineffective, and some of the agencies had credibility problems since their leaders had been accused of corruption. In April 2010, Aliyu announced his presidential nomination to be a candidate in the 2011 presidential elections.

Personal life
His son Mahdi Aliyu Gusau (born 1981) served as deputy governor of Zamfara State from 2019 till his impeachment in 2022.

Honours

National honours

Foreign honours

Legacy

Gusau Institute 
Aliyu founded the Gusau Institute in Kaduna, donating his private library and publications, to the research centre to promote national development.

References

1943 births
Living people
Directors General of the National Security Organization
Nigerian security personnel
National Security Organization staff
Nigerian Defence Academy Commandants
Nigerian Defence Academy people
Chiefs of Army Staff (Nigeria)
People from Zamfara State
Defence ministers of Nigeria